Warenius nankaiensis is a species of sea snail, a marine gastropod mollusk in the family Eosiphonidae, the true whelks and their allies.

Description

Distribution
This marine species occurs off Japan.

References

 Okutani T. & Iwasaki N. 2003. Noteworthy abyssal mollusks (excluding vesicomyid bivalves) collected from the Nankai Trough off Shikoku by the ROV Kaiko of the Japan Marine Science & Technology Center. Venus 62(1-2): 1-1

External links
 Kantor Y.I., Kosyan A., Sorokin P., Herbert D.G. & Fedosov A. (2020). Review of the abysso-hadal genus Bayerius (Gastropoda: Neogastropoda: Buccinidae) from the North-West Pacific, with description of two new species. Deep Sea Research Part I: Oceanographic Research Papers. 160: 103256

Eosiphonidae
Gastropods described in 2003